This is a list of Association football clubs in Bonaire.

 Arriba Perú
 Atlétiko Flamingo (Nikiboko)
 Atlétiko Tera Corá
 Real Rincon
 SV Estrellas (Nort Saliña Kunuku Bieu)
 SV Juventus (Antriòl)
 SV Vespo (Rincon)
 SV Vitesse (Antriòl)

Bonaire
 
Football clubs

Football clubs